International School of Business & Media (ISB&M) is a group of private business schools in India, founded in 2000.

Post Graduate Diploma in Management (PGDM)

ISB&M Pune, Nande Campus

ISB&M Nande offers 2 years Post Graduation Diploma in Management (PGDM) programme with dual specialization.
   Marketing
 	Finance
 	Human Resource Management
 	Logistic & Supply Chain Management
 	Media & Communication 
 	Business Analytics

An inter-campus exchange programme is also available to combine different programmes of specialization by spending one trimester at another campus

ISB&M Kolkata Campus

ISB&M Kolkata offers 2 years full-time Post Graduation Diploma in Management (PGDM) programme with dual specialization.
       Marketing
 	Finance
 	Human Resource Management
 	Supply Chain & Operations Management
  	Media & Communication

Undergraduate Programme

ISB&M College of Commerce  
ISB&M COC affiliated to Savitribai Phule Pune University offering 3 years full-time Under-graduate courses in the following disciplines
       BBA 
 	BBA (Computer Application) 
 	BBA + Media/ Healthcare Management  
 	BBA( Computer Application) + Media/Healthcare Management

The programme is made up of general business, specialist business, and liberal arts subjects.

ISB&M School of Technology Pune

ISB&M School of Technology is a part of the Pune-Nande campus. It is approved by AICTE, New Delhi, recognized by DTE and affiliated to the University of Pune. It offers a four-year full-time Bachelor of Engineering degree in the following disciplines:
 Mechanical Engineering
 Electronics & Telecommunication Engineering
 Computer Engineering
 Digital Automation & Robotics
(Optional Certificate Program)

Student life

Student cells
ISB&M has numerous cells which are essentially student-driven and managed by the students but usually have a faculty member as a guide and mentor. Each cell focuses on a different need or aspect of student life.
The student cells are as follows:
   	
       Campus Recruitment
 	Corporate Relation Cell
 	Alumni Cell
 	Digital Moments Cell
 	Sports Academy
 	Cultural Cell  
 	Digital Marketing Cell
 	Debate Cell
 	CSR Cell
 	Medios 
 	Marketing club
 	Scope Club
 	Intellectual -Talk
 	TOFI
 	Grey cell

Events
The Student Council organizes several events, giving them experience in planning, budgeting and managing events. Events are an integral part of a student's life not only for enjoyment but also to help develop their managerial skills.

HR Share: An annual two-day HR conference where industry leaders are invited to discuss emerging trends in Human Resource.

Chain Act: A supply chain conference hosted by ISB&M where speakers from industry share their experiences on contemporary issues in Supply Chain Management.

Crescendo: An annual three-day cultural programme organized by the students of the Pune-Nande campus, including quizzes, dance, music, painting, innovative games and a fashion show. On the last day, a prominent artist performs live.

References

External links
 ISB&M Official Website

All India Council for Technical Education
Business schools in Maharashtra
Business schools in Bangalore
Business schools in Kolkata
Business schools in India
2000 establishments in Maharashtra
Educational institutions established in 2000